Billy Eidi (born in 1955) is a French classical pianist of Lebanese background.

Biography 
Born in Egypt, Eidi did his first musical studies at the Beirut Conservatory (in the classes of Zafer Dabaghi and Leila Aouad), where he graduated at fifteen.

In 1981, he won second prize in the International Viotti-Valsesia Competition.

He is also a laureate of the Menuhin foundation, as well as of the "Francis Poulenc International Competition" (prize for melody with baritone Jean-François Gardeil).

In his concerts throughout the world (France, England, Italy, Switzerland, Belgium, Spain, Germany, Luxembourg, Czech Republic, Greece, Bulgaria, Ukraine, Sweden, United States, Japan, South Korea and the Middle East), he particularly defends the romantic repertoire and the French music of the twentieth century, striving to discover unknown authors and repertoires.

Eidi has created pieces by Erik Satie (Sixième Nocturne), Henri Sauguet (Ombres sur Venise which is dedicated to him), Maurice Jaubert, Guy Sacre, Karol Beffa...

He is also a passionate of the French melody, who works tirelessly for a better knowledge and a renewal of the genre.

It is in this spirit that he founded the associations Contrechants (1991-1995, concerts "Piano au Palais-Royal", in collaboration with the Bibliothèque nationale) and Les Donneurs de sérénades (1997-1998, melodic cycles at the ), and that he gives, with the composer Guy Sacre, concerts-conferences centred on musical and literary aesthetic themes, such as les musiques de la nuit, la musique et les éléments, and les masques et bergamasques which convene Fauré and Debussy around Verlaine and Watteau.

These tastes and these concerns are to be found in his records, to this day about fifteen, of which many premières: as well works for piano (Sauguet, Milhaud, Scriabine, Sacre, Satie, Poulenc, Séverac) as melodies (Ravel, Debussy, Poulenc, Auric, Honegger, Chausson, Delage, Sacre), Albert Roussel's complete work, with Marie Devellereau, Yann Beuron and Laurent Naouri.

His version of Poulenc's L'Histoire de Babar, le petit éléphant, with Hugues Cuénod, is now a reference.

Among his latest records, his CD devoted to Déodat de Séverac's piano work was awarded a "Diapason d'or".

He is regularly invited for master classes, both in France and abroad (notably in Spain, China, Japan and South Korea).

Discography 
(selection)
 Maurice Delage: mélodies with Sandrine Piau, Jean-Paul Fouchécourt and Jean-François Gardeil
 Guy Sacre: Œuvres pour piano (Timpani)
 Déodat de Séverac: Baigneuses au soleil, Cerdana, Sous les lauriers roses, Les Naïades and le Faune indiscret (Pionovox)
 Erik Satie: Socrate - 6 Nocturnes - with Jean Belliard
 Guy Sacre - Mélodies with Florence Katz and Jean-François Gardeil
 Guy Sacre - 24 Préludes for piano (Timpani)
 Ravel/Poulenc: Mélodies with Jean-François Gardeil
 Gabriel Fauré: Mélodies with Yann Beuron
 Arthur Honegger: Les Mélodies with Brigitte Balleys and Jean-François Gardeil (Timpani)
 Henri Sauguet: Mélodies with Jean-François Gardeil (Timpani)
 Darius Milhaud: Première Sonate; Printemps; L'Automne; Quatre Sketches; Sonatine
 Claude Debussy / Albert Roussel: Les mélodies with Jean-François Gardeil (Adda)
 Gabriel Fauré:  treize Barcarolles and the 3rd collection of melodies (with tenor Yann Beuron)

Awards 
 1981: Second Prize of the Concours international Viotti-Valsesia.
 1985: Best Piano Singing Team Award at the "Francis Poulenc International Competition" (with baritone Jean-François Gardeil).
 Laureate of the Menuhin Foundation
 1993: Grand Prix of the Académie Charles-Cros and Grand Prix of the "Nouvelle Académie du Disque français".

References

External links 
 Billy Eidi
 Nouvelle version du Rossignol éperdu de R. Hahn par Billy Eidi (ResMusica)
 Billy Eidi's discography (Discogs)
 Discography (AllMusic)
 Billy Eidi: C'est à Beyrouth que j'ai découvert la musique classique 
 Ravel - Cinq Mélodies populaires grecques (Jean-François Gardeil & Billy Eidi) (YouTube)

1955 births
Living people
21st-century French male classical pianists
20th-century French male classical pianists
École Normale de Musique de Paris alumni
Academic staff of the Conservatoire de Paris